Kirubel Erassa (born June 17, 1993) is an Ethiopian-born American middle- and long-distance runner. Kirubel was a silver medalist in 3000 meters at the 2014 NCAA Division I Indoor Track and Field Championships and seven-time All-American in NCAA Division 1 track and field.

Early life
Erassa attended Grayson High School and was a national elite high school runner  there. He earned spot on the 2009 Foot Locker Cross Country Championships team. He also ran in the 2010 adidas Jim Ryun Boys Dream Mile at the New York Diamond League in June. At the 2010 Nike Indoor Nationals, Erassa placed first in the 5000 meters and was runner-up in the mile run.

In his junior year, Erassa earned the Georgia AAAAA state championship in 1600 metres and competed at the Nike Outdoor Nationals. He took the Georgia AAAAA state championship in cross country and 1600 metres as a senior, as well as being the 3200 metres runner-up.

Oklahoma State University

Track and field
In his first year in collegiate track and field he placed third in the mile at the Big 12 Conference indoor championships and ninth in the 3000 m. At the regional outdoor championships he was only tenth in the 5000 m, but managed fourth in the 1500 meters.

He won the Big 12 Conference outdoor championship in the 5000 m in his second year and also was the 3000 m runner-up at that level. He gained NCAA All-American honours in the indoor mile and outdoor 5000 m (ninth place) that year.

He placed in the top three of all his events at Big 12 Conference championship in his junior year. Indoors he was runner-up in the mile and third in the 3000 m, then outdoors he took second place in the 1500 m and third in the 5000 m. At the NCAA championships he was sixth in the distance medley relay, third over 3000 m and 18th in the 5000 m.

In his final year at Oklahoma state he took a clean sweep of Big 12 Conference titles, including the mile, 3000 m  and 5000 m indoors and a 5000/10,000 meters double outdoors. In his last appearance at the NCAA Men's Division I Outdoor Track and Field Championships Kirubel was the 3000 m runner-up and also earned All American honours in the distance medley relay.

Cross country
In his freshman year at Oklahoma state he placed seventh in the Big 12 Conference cross country, then improved to second place the following year, in which Oklahoma State Cowboys took the team title. His 102nd place finish at the 2012 NCAA Men's Division I Cross Country Championship also helped his school to the NCAA team title. He was the winner of the Big 12 Conference race in his third year.

International

2012
He was named USA Track & Field’s Athlete of the Week on 11 January 2012 as a result of his victory in the  junior men’s 6 km race at the Great Edinburgh International Cross Country. He was the only American individual winner and led the American junior men to a team title.

2016
Kirubel Erassa placed 26th at the 2016 Great Edinburgh International Cross Country Senior 8 km race. Erassa ran 4:04.5 placed 7th on the road at the 2016 Grandma's Minnesota Mile on September 11th.

USA National Championships

References

External links
 Athlete Spotlight

1993 births
Living people
Ethiopian emigrants to the United States
People from Stillwater, Oklahoma
Sportspeople from the Atlanta metropolitan area
People from Gwinnett County, Georgia
Track and field athletes from Oklahoma
American male middle-distance runners
African-American male track and field athletes
21st-century African-American sportspeople